Whopee Hill is a summit in Ohio County, Kentucky, in the United States.

Whoopee Hill has been noted for its unusual place name.

References

Landforms of Ohio County, Kentucky
Mountains of Kentucky